Monte Cevedale is a mountain at the border of the Lombardy and Trentino-Alto Adige/Südtirol regions in Italy. The southern summit (3769 m) is the highest mountain of Trentino province, while three provinces, Sondrio, South Tyrol, and Trentino meet on the northern summit (3757 m), known as Cima Cevedale or Zufallspitze.

Mountains of the Alps
Alpine three-thousanders
Mountains of Italy
Mountains of Lombardy